Duke Hui of Qin may refer to:

Duke Hui I of Qin, reigned 500–492 BC
Duke Hui II of Qin, reigned 399–387 BC